Outlawed is the fourth studio album by American metalcore band Attila. The album was released on August 16, 2011, through Artery Recordings. It is the band's second release on the label. Upon its release it charted the Billboard 200 at number 87, selling 4,700 units in its first week.

The album is the first by the band to be produced by Joey Sturgis, who has previously worked with such bands as The Devil Wears Prada, We Came as Romans, Asking Alexandria And Miss May I.

Track listing

Personnel
Attila
Chris "Fronz" Fronzak – vocals
Nate Salameh – rhythm guitar
Chris Linck – lead guitar
Chris Comrie – bass, backing vocals
Sean Heenan – drums, percussion

Production
 Produced, Engineered, Mixed and mastered by Joey Sturgis
 A&R, management and layout by Mike Milford (The Artery Foundation)
 Booking by Matt Andersen (The Pantheon Agency)

References

2011 albums
Attila (metalcore band) albums
Artery Recordings albums
Albums produced by Joey Sturgis
Rapcore albums